Alain Grumelon (born 22 June 1957) is a French former professional footballer who played as a midfielder. He spent half of his career at Lille, where he made 203 appearances and scored six goals in the league.

Honours 
Lille
 Division 2: 1977–78

References 

1957 births
Living people
Sportspeople from Côtes-d'Armor
French footballers
Footballers from Brittany
Association football midfielders
France youth international footballers
France under-21 international footballers
INF Vichy players
Lille OSC players
FC Mulhouse players
Clermont Foot players
Ligue 1 players
Ligue 2 players
French Division 3 (1971–1993) players
French football managers
SAS Épinal managers